Bowie High School is a public high school in Bowie, Maryland, United States and a part of Prince George's County Public Schools.

It serves Bowie, Queen Anne CDP, and portions of the Brock Hall, Fairwood, Glenn Dale, and Woodmore CDPs. It serves sections of the former Greater Upper Marlboro CDP.

History

Bowie High School was built in 1965 in Bowie, Maryland.

In 2005, PGCPS placed the 9th graders in the Belair annex in Bowie as the main school building was becoming overcrowded. The main building remained overcrowded in 2018, as even after the move, the number of temporary buildings was to go down from 16 to 12.

Academics

In 2007 Bowie High was among the top 5 percent of U.S. high schools for AP participation. It also had a honors program for highly motivated students named the SUMMIT program, where 60 students take college level honor and AP courses to prepare them for college and career.

Notable alumni

 Alessandro Battilocchio, socialist politician
 Michael Beasley, NBA basketball player
 Scott Buete, soccer player  
 Eva Cassidy, singer and musician
 JC Chasez, singer-songwriter
 Brian Ellerbe, basketball coach. 
 Kathie Lee Gifford, entertainer
 A. J. Hendy, football player
 Todd Hicks, Pro soccer player
 Erik Imler, soccer player
 Mark Jonas, soccer player
 John Kaleo, football player
 Brad Schumacher, swimmer and water polo player
 Paul Reed Smith, namesake of PRS Guitars.
 Chris Volz, Singer/songwriter
 Abby Phillip, journalist

Drinking and drunk driving
In the 1980s, Bowie High School had a high rate of drinking and gained national attention. In 1986, the school initiated programs to curb drunk driving after 15 students were killed in 1979 and 1980. In 1986, another three were killed in a drunk driving accident on the Capital Beltway.In recent years, teenagers at Bowie HS are not drinking alcohol at nearly the same rate they were in the 70s or 80s.

See also 
 List of high schools in Maryland

References

External links
 Bowie High School website

Bowie High School
Buildings and structures in Bowie, Maryland
Schools in Prince George's County, Maryland
Educational institutions established in 1965
1965 establishments in Maryland